Club Oriental, is a Paraguayan football club based in the barrio of La Chacarita, in Asunción. The club was founded March 12, 1912 and plays in the third division of the Paraguayan league. Their home games are played at the Oriental stadium.

Honours
Paraguayan Second Division: 1
1981

Paraguayan Third Division: 3
1963, 1967, 1998

External links
Oriental Info

Football clubs in Paraguay
Football clubs in Asunción
Association football clubs established in 1912
1912 establishments in Paraguay